Ian Roy Whittaker (13 July 1928 – 16 October 2022) was a British set decorator and actor. He won an Academy Award and was nominated three more times in the category Best Art Direction.

Whittaker died of prostate cancer on 16 October 2022, at the age of 94.

Selected filmography
Whittaker won an Academy Award for Best Art Direction and was nominated for three more:
Won
 Howards End (1992)
Nominated
 Alien (1979)
 The Remains of the Day (1993)
 Anna and the King (1999)

References

External links

1928 births
2022 deaths
British set decorators
Best Art Direction Academy Award winners
Film people from London